CCGS Capt. Jacques Cartier is an offshore fisheries research ship of the Canadian Coast Guard. The ship was ordered in 2011 as part of the Canadian National Shipbuilding Procurement Strategy (NSPS) as a replacement for aging Canadian Coast Guard vessels. The ship was constructed at Seaspan Shipyard, Vancouver, British Columbia and  launched on 5 June 2019.

Design and description
Capt. Jacques Cartier is the second of three vessels ordered on 19 October 2011 by the Canadian government under the NSPS for offshore fisheries research. The initial design for the research vessels called for a -long ship that could act as "floating laboratories for scientific research and ecosystem-based management." However, when Seaspan received the technical plans from the government in 2012, they found that the ship's design would be prone to capsizing. The ships were constructed in 37 blocks and welded together. The ships are equipped with four labs; a wet lab, a dry lab, an ocean lab and a control lab.

Service history
The research vessel was constructed at Seaspan Shipyard, Vancouver, British Columbia and launched on 5 June 2019. After sea trials, Capt. Jacques Cartier will be assigned to the Canadian Coast Guard base at Dartmouth, Nova Scotia. Sea trials began on 10 October 2019. The vessel completed sea trials and was handed over to the Canadian Coast Guard on 11 December 2019. Capt. Jacques Cartier is home ported at Dartmouth, Nova Scotia.

However, after arriving in Nova Scotia, the vessel has been beset by a series of problems that have prevented Capt. Jacques Cartier from becoming operational. A series of malfunctions with the winches, sensors and engines, a shortage of spare parts and issues related to the COVID-19 pandemic have stopped the ship from performing the training and trials needed to be fully operational. 

In June 2022, the ship began a planned maintenance period that included replacing bearings in a stern propeller tube that allows the propeller to turn smoothly. The problem was assessed as one common to all three vessels in the class. The refit was then extended by two months to address other issues. The extended refit was reported as unlikely to impact upcoming science programs on Capt. Jacques Cartier.

Notes

Citations

2019 ships
Ships of the Canadian Coast Guard
Ships built in British Columbia